Rahdar (also Romanized as Rāhdār) is a village in Dalaki Rural District, in the Central District of Dashtestan County, Bushehr Province, Iran. When counted during the 2006 census, its population was 1,454, in 305 families.

References 

Populated places in Dashtestan County